The Men's 100m T37 had its competition held on September 12, with the first round at 9:25 and the Final at 17:45.

Medalists

Results

References
Round 1 - Heat 1
Round 1 - Heat 2
Round 1 - Heat 3
Final

Athletics at the 2008 Summer Paralympics